Shao Shuai may refer to:

Shao Shuai (footballer, born 1989)
Shao Shuai (footballer, born 1997)